The Visconti Castle of Crenna is a castle of mediaeval origin located in Crenna, frazione of Gallarate, Lombardy, Northern Italy. It is linked to the fame of Lodrisio Visconti, who raised against and then reconciled with the members of the family of his cousin Matteo Visconti, Lord of Milan. In the 14th century, the castle underwent expansion and destruction according to the alternative fortunes of Lodrisio.

Since the 19th century, a group of private estates, also in the form of revival castle, have been constructed near the original building, characterizing today the area.

Location
The Visconti Castle is located on the top of a hill over the valley of the Arno torrent. The position favors the control of the territory to the east toward Milan. The location is therefore believed to be at the origin of the initial settlements and fortifications.

History
The castle is mentioned for the first time in the 12th-century sources. At the end of the 13th century, it was received  by Pietro Visconti with other nearby castles (Besnate, Orago and Jerago) as part of a division between him and Matteo and Uberto, sons of Teobaldo Visconti. In the neighboring Gallarate, Teobaldo, after being captured by members of the opposite faction supporting the Della Torre family, was executed in 1276.

The castle was inherited by Lodrisio, son of Pietro, who greatly expanded it. In the meantime, his cousin Matteo became Lord of Milan. After the death of Matteo in 1322, a conflict between his sons and Lodrisio arose. Lodrisio was dislodged from Crenna and the castle destroyed. After having put together the Compagnia di San Giorgio, a militia of mercenaries, in 1339 he was finally defeated in the Battle of Parabiago by an army led by Azzone, grandson of Matteo. Lodrisio later reconciled with their cousins and the castle was subsequently restored.

The castle was later transferred to the Visconti di Crenna, the Visconti cadet branch originated by Lodrisio and named after Crenna. Over several generations, divisions among brothers led to the fragmentation of the area surrounding the castle. In the 16th and 17th centuries, the building underwent changes and adaptations after further family divisions. New buildings, in the form of revival castle, were later added.

The Visconti di Crenna became extinct in 1722, and the buildings were transferred consequently to other families.

Today
Transformed during the late 19th and the first decades of the 20th century, the area of the ancient castle is today partly surrounded by recent buildings. A tower and other constructions in the form of revival caste are visible from the center of Crenna. The eastern façade of the castle, looking toward Gallarate, can be seen from a distance at the top of the Crenna hill.

References

Sources

External links
Lombardia Beni Culturali – Castello di Crenna, Gallarate (VA)
Libera Associazione Besnate – I castelli della valle dell’Arno. Prima parte: Crenna e Caiello

Castles in Lombardy
Gallarate